Piergiorgio is a masculine Italian given name. Notable people with the name include:

Piergiorgio Cortelazzo (born 1969), Italian politician
Piergiorgio Farina (1933–2008), Italian jazz violinist
Piergiorgio Negrisolo (born 1950), Italian footballer
Piergiorgio Nesti (1931–2009), Italian Roman Catholic archbishop
Piergiorgio Odifreddi (born 1950), Italian mathematician and writer
Piergiorgio Welby (1945–2006), Italian poet, painter and activist
Pier Giorgio Frassati (1901-1925), Italian blessed (i.e., on the path to sainthood)

Italian masculine given names